John William Knight (20 November 19434 March 1981) was an Australian politician.  He represented the Australian Capital Territory (ACT) in the Senate, for the Liberal Party of Australia, from 1975 until his death in 1981.

John Knight was born in Armidale, New South Wales.  He gained a Bachelor of Arts from the University of New England and a Master of Arts from the East–West Center, Hawaii, as a Fulbright scholar.  He was Private Secretary to Billy Snedden, then became a diplomat.  He was secretary of the ACT Branch of the Liberal Party in 1974–75.  In 1975 he was visiting fellow at the Australian National University.

In 1975, the ACT and the Northern Territory each became entitled to elect two senators to the Senate, and John Knight (Liberal) and Susan Ryan (Labor) were elected as the ACT's first two senators on 13 December 1975.  He was re-elected at the 1977 election.

John Knight represented the Commonwealth government at the bicentenary celebrations of Captain James Cook's arrival in Hawaii, in January 1978.  In March 1978 he was appointed the Government Deputy Whip in the Senate.

Knight died suddenly on 4 March 1981. The casual vacancy created by his death was filled by Margaret Reid.

Sources
Parliamentary Handbook of the Commonwealth of Australia, 20th ed, 1978

Liberal Party of Australia members of the Parliament of Australia
Members of the Australian Senate for the Australian Capital Territory
Australian diplomats
1943 births
1981 deaths
20th-century Australian politicians
Fulbright alumni